In number theory, Hilbert's irreducibility theorem, conceived by David Hilbert in 1892, states that every finite set of irreducible polynomials in a finite number of variables and having rational number coefficients admit a common specialization of a proper subset of the variables to rational numbers such that all the polynomials remain irreducible.  This theorem is a prominent theorem in number theory.

Formulation of the theorem 
Hilbert's irreducibility theorem. Let

be irreducible polynomials in the ring

Then there exists an r-tuple of rational numbers (a1, ..., ar) such that

are irreducible in the ring

Remarks.
 It follows from the theorem that there are infinitely many r-tuples. In fact the set of all irreducible specializations, called Hilbert set, is large in many senses. For example, this set is Zariski dense in 
 There are always (infinitely many) integer specializations, i.e., the assertion of the theorem holds even if we demand  (a1, ..., ar) to be integers.
 There are many Hilbertian fields, i.e., fields satisfying Hilbert's irreducibility theorem. For example, number fields are Hilbertian.
 The irreducible specialization property stated in the theorem is the most general. There are many reductions, e.g., it suffices to take  in the definition.

Applications 
Hilbert's irreducibility theorem has numerous applications in number theory and algebra. For example:

 The inverse Galois problem, Hilbert's original motivation. The theorem almost immediately implies that if a finite group G can be realized as the Galois group of a Galois extension N of

then it can be specialized to a Galois extension N0 of the rational numbers with G as its Galois group. (To see this, choose a monic irreducible polynomial f(X1, ..., Xn, Y) whose root generates N over E. If f(a1, ..., an, Y) is irreducible for some ai, then a root of it will generate the asserted N0.)

 Construction of elliptic curves with large rank.

 Hilbert's irreducibility theorem is used as a step in the Andrew Wiles proof of Fermat's Last Theorem.

(More elementary proofs exist.)  The same result is true when "square" is replaced by "cube", "fourth power", etc.

Generalizations 

It has been reformulated and generalized extensively, by using the language of algebraic geometry. See thin set (Serre).

References 
 D. Hilbert, "Uber die Irreducibilitat ganzer rationaler Functionen mit ganzzahligen Coefficienten", J. reine angew. Math. 110 (1892) 104–129.

J. P. Serre, Lectures on The Mordell-Weil Theorem, Vieweg, 1989.
M. D. Fried and M. Jarden, Field Arithmetic, Springer-Verlag, Berlin, 2005.
H. Völklein, Groups as Galois Groups, Cambridge University Press, 1996.
G. Malle and B. H. Matzat, Inverse Galois Theory, Springer, 1999.

Theorems in number theory
Theorems about polynomials
David Hilbert